The 1995 All-Western Athletic Conference football team consists of American football players chosen for their All-Western Athletic Conference ("WAC") teams for the 1995 NCAA Division I-A football season. Five teams dominated the 1995 All-WAC first team as follows:

 Conference co-champion BYU placed six players on the first team: tight end Chad Lewis, offensive lineman Larry Moore, linebackers Shay Muirbrook and Stan Raass, and defensive lineman John Raass.
 Conference co-champion Colorado State placed five players on the first team: offensive lineman James Cregg, defensive linemen Sean Moran and Brady Smith, and defensive backs Ray Jackson and Greg Myers.
 Wyoming finished in sixth place but placed five players on the first team: wide receiver Marcus Harris, offensive lineman Steve Scifres, defensive lineman Joe Cummings, placekicker Cory Wedel, and punter Brian Gragert.
 Fifth-place San Diego State placed four players on the first team: running back George Jones, wide receiver Will Blackwell, offensive lineman Chris Finch, and defensive back Ricky Parker.
 Conference co-champion Air Force placed three players on the first team: quarterback Beau Morgan, offensive lineman Bret Cillessen, and linebacker Brian McCray.

Offensive selections

Quarterbacks
 Beau Morgan, Air Force

Running backs
 George Jones, San Diego State
 Winslow Oliver, New Mexico

Wide receivers
 Will Blackwell, San Diego State
 Marcus Harris, Wyoming
 Charlie Jones, Fresno State

Tight ends
 Chad Lewis, BYU

Offensive linemen
 Bret Cillessen, Air Force
 James Cregg, Colorado State
 Chris Finch, San Diego State
 Larry Moore, BYU
 Steve Scifres, Wyoming

Defensive selections

Defensive linemen
 Joe Cummings, Wyoming
 Sean Moran, Colorado State
 John Raass, BYU
 Brady Smith, Colorado State

Linebackers
 Michael Comer, Texas-El Paso
 Brian McCray, Air Force
 Shay Muirbrook, BYU
 Stan Raass, BYU

Defensive backs
 Ray Jackson, Colorado State
 Harold Lusk, Utah
 Greg Myers, Colorado State
 Ricky Parker, San Diego State

Special teams

Placekickers
 Cory Wedel, Wyoming

Punters
 Brian Gragert, Wyoming

Return specialist
 James Dye, BYU

See also
1995 College Football All-America Team

References

All-Western Athletic Conference football team
All-Western Athletic Conference football teams